Sphelele Mkhulise (born 19 February 1996) is a South African soccer player who plays as a midfielder or winger for Mamelodi Sundowns.

Club career
Mkhulise started his career with Mamelodi Sundowns, South Africa's most successful club.

In 2016, he was sent on loan to Black Leopards in the South African second division.

In 2021, Mkhulise received interest from French Ligue 1 side Monaco.

International career
He made his debut for South Africa national soccer team on 10 June 2021 in a friendly against Uganda. He then represented his country at the 2021 COSAFA Cup, which South Africa won, scoring two goals in the group stage.

References

External links
 
 Sphelele Mkhulise at playmakerstats.com

South African soccer players
Living people
South Africa international soccer players
Mamelodi Sundowns F.C. players
South African Premier Division players
National First Division players
Black Leopards F.C. players
Richards Bay F.C. players
1996 births
Association football wingers
Association football midfielders